There are over 30 high-rise buildings in Bratislava over 80 meters high with dozens in the planning process or in construction. These are sometimes incorrectly called skyscrapers, predominantly in print; however, currently (2021) there are no true skyscrapers in Bratislava (over 150 meters high). The 168 meters high Eurovea 2 tower got the land-use permit in the Summer of 2019 and as of Winter 2021, it is halfway through construction. After completion, it will become the first true skyscraper in both Bratislava and Slovakia. Since the 2010s there is a forming of a new Bratislava downtown area next to the Danube river called "Nivy" where the majority of current high-rise buildings and future skyscrapers are located. Because of the lack of high-rise city planning, a lot of 100m buildings are scattered all around the city.

The tallest building is currently the Nivy Tower with 125 meters in height and 29 floors. It's part of the large Bratislava project of the new Central Bus Station.

The tallest structure in Bratislava is the Kamzik TV tower with 196 meters.

List of buildings

Towers and other structures
 Kamzík TV Tower, 196 m
 UFO Restaurant on top of the Nový most bridge, 85 m
 St. Martin's Concathedral, 85 m
 the central pillar on Slavín, 39,5 m

See also
 List of tallest structures in Slovakia
 Skyscraper
 High-rise building

References

External links
 High-rise buildings in Bratislava at skyscraperpage.com
 Page on Bratislava high-rise buildings emporis.com

Tallest buildings
Bratislava
 
Tallest, Bratislava